W. H. Lane Crauford was the pen name of William Harold Craxford (1884-1955). Craxford was born into a theatrical family but worked for most of his life at the Midland Bank. In his spare time he published many novels, some of which were crime novels and others of which were light social comedy in the spirit of P. G. Wodehouse.

Works

Mystery novels

The Missing Ace    
The Hawkmoor Mystery    
The Crimson Mask    
The Final Curtain 
The Ravenscroft Mystery    
Murder To Music (1936)   
A Date With Death    
Joseph Proctor's Money 
The Bride Wears Black    
Till Murder Do Us Part    
Drakmere Must Die    
Elementary My Dear Freddie 
A Man's Shadow (1951)   
Where Is Jenny Willet?    
The Dearly Beloved Wives    
The Ivory Goddess

Humour

Follow The Lady    
Judy    
Dogs In Clover    
When The Devil Was Well 
Sally To Oblige
The Idle Hours of a Victorious Invalid
The Imperfect Gentleman    
Pat Preferred (1935)   
The Sixteenth Earl 
And Then A Boy    
Fly Away Peter    
All The King's Men    
Priscilla Goes Astray 
Love On The Run    
Almost A Lady    
An Apple A Day    
Good-Bye George 
The Marriage Of Sophie    
Miss Nobody    
Ladies First    
Gentlemen, The Queen 
Too Good To Be True    
The Stork And Mr Melvil    
The Sky's The Limit    
Time Gentlemen, Please 
And Then There Were Nine    
Money For Jam (1946)   
Clothes And The Man    
Murder Of A Dead Man 
One Man's Meat    
Another Woman's Poison

External links
 Craxford family website

1884 births
1955 deaths
English male novelists
20th-century English novelists
20th-century English male writers